Bhatoora (also known as batoora, bhatura, batura, or pathora) is a fluffy deep-fried leavened sourdough bread originating from the Indian subcontinent. It is commonly served as a midday meal or a breakfast dish in northern and eastern India. Paired with chickpea curry (called chole or channe), it forms a traditional dish called chole bhature which originated in Punjab.

This bread is like the puri bread but is made with leavened dough.

Preparation
A typical recipe includes all-purpose flour (maida), dahi (yogurt), ghee or oil, and either yeast or baking powder. Once kneaded well, the dough is left to rise, and then small balls of this dough are either hand-rolled or flattened using a rolling pin. The bread pieces are then deep fried until they puff up into a lightly browned, soft, fluffy bread, which is elastic and chewy.

Bhatura is often eaten with yogurt, pickle, or vegetables. When eaten with chole, it forms a popular traditional dish known as chole bhature.

Variations 
A variation of this dish is to use semolina flour instead of all purpose flour.  Other variations include aloo bhatura (bhatura filled with potato) and paneer bhatura (bhatura filled with paneer). 

A nonfried variant is the kulcha, which can be baked or cooked on a flat pan and is garnished with coriander leaves.

See also
Chana masala
Punjabi cuisine
Puri
Paratha
Roti
Naan
Kulcha
List of Indian breads
List of Pakistani breads
 Fried bake, a very similar fried bread found in Trinidad, in the Caribbean

References

External links

Bhatura recipe 
Bhatura recipe
http://www.tarladalal.com/Chole-Bhature-2810r

Indian breads
Flatbreads
Punjabi cuisine
Deep fried foods
Pakistani breads